Tramitichromis lituris is a species of cichlid endemic to Lake Malawi where it prefers sandy shallows.  It can reach a length of  TL.  It can also be found in the aquarium trade.

References

External links 
 Photograph

Fish of Malawi
lituris
Taxa named by Ethelwynn Trewavas
Fish described in 1931
Taxonomy articles created by Polbot
Fish of Lake Malawi